Dubplate Drama is a British television drama series, created, written and directed by Luke Hyams, first broadcast on Channel 4 on 11 November 2005. The series follows the plight of teenage grime MC Dionne lead actress played by (Chanel "Shystie" Cali), as she tries to achieve her dream of obtaining a major-label record deal to help provide for her grandmother. The series was described as "the world's first interactive drama series", as it allowed viewers to vote on the outcome of each episode through an interactive text service. Thus, two alternative versions of every episode were filmed, with the version broadcast depending on the outcome of the viewer vote. The series featured appearances from a number of well-known British grime and hip-hop musicians, including Rodney P, Dappy, Tulisa, Fazer, Big Narstie and Tim Westwood.

Aside from being shown on Channel 4, the series also aired on MTV Base and was made available on demand via social networking site MySpace. Despite a late-night timeslot, the first series, comprising six fifteen-minute episodes, earned a peak audience of 480,000 viewers and was critically well received. Across the course of the six-week broadcast, the series gathered a combined audience of 3.3 million viewers. Subsequently, the second series was awarded the fixed timeslot of 12.30am on Thursdays, with episodes being rerun on E4 the following weekend. The second series was also extended to twelve episodes, which ran at an extended length of thirty minutes each. A third and final series, comprising two sixty-minute episodes, broadcast in 2009. The final episode was sponsored by the NSPCC as part of their Childline campaign, to highlight the dangers of knife and gun crime.

Release
The first series was released on DVD via Revolver Entertainment on 29 October 2007. The second series followed on 4 February 2008. The third series currently remains unreleased on DVD. Each of the DVD releases contain a number of exclusive bonus features, including alternative scenes, music videos and an alternative final episode of the second series.

A mixtape featuring music used in the first series was issued on 3 April 2006. A second mixtape followed on 22 October 2007. An official soundtrack to accompany the second series, entitled Dubstep Drama, was issued on 8 October 2007.

Cast

Main cast
 Chanelle Scott as Dionne (Series 1—3)
 Tyler "Hoodman" Daley as Warren (Series 1—2)
 Roger Griffiths as D-Brain (Series 1—3)
 Daniel Parmar as Redhand (Series 1—2)
 Michael Coombs as Errol (Series 2—3)
 Ricci Harnett as Prangers (Series 1—3)
 Duane Henry as Drama (Series 2)
 Tendayi Jembere as Minus (Series 2)
 Adam Deacon as Bones (Series 2)
 Tulisa Contostavlos as Laurissa (Series 2—3)
 Dino Contostavlos as Sleezy (Series 2)
 Big Narstie as Bigman (Series 2—3)
 Katia Winter as Scarlett (Series 2)
 Charles Mnene as Devil (Series 3)
 Darragh Mortell as Mikey (Series 3)
 Rodney Panton as Narrator (Series 1—2)

Supporting cast
 Jess Luisa-Flynn as Susannah (Series 1)
 Abdul Salis as Melvin (Series 1)
 Duran Fulton Brown as Bagley (Series 2)
 Gemma Stone as Monica (Series 2)
 Jacquelyn Mills as Maureen (Series 2)
 Blanche Williams as Grandma (Series 2)
 Liam Reilly as Sarge (Series 2)
 Richard Rawson as Flames (Series 2)
 Isaac Ssebandeke as Millz (Series 3)
 Jamie Di Spirito as Shane (Series 3)

Episodes

Series 1 (2005)

Series 2 (2007)

Series 3 (2009)

External links

References

2005 British television series debuts
2009 British television series endings
2000s British drama television series
Channel 4 original programming
Black British television shows
English-language television shows